Ceriomura is a genus of South American jumping spiders that was first described by Eugène Louis Simon in 1901.

Species
 it contains four species, found in Peru, Argentina, Brazil, and Colombia:
Ceriomura casanare Galvis, 2017 – Colombia
Ceriomura cruenta (Peckham & Peckham, 1894) (type) – Brazil
Ceriomura damborskyae Rubio & Baigorria, 2016 – Argentina
Ceriomura perita (Peckham & Peckham, 1894) – Peru

References

External links

 Ceriomura at Salticidae: Diagnostic Drawings Library

Salticidae genera
Invertebrates of Brazil
Invertebrates of Peru
Salticidae
Spiders of South America